Takalarup (post code 6324) is a small township in the Shire of Plantagenet in the Great Southern region of Western Australia. At the 2021 census, it had a population of 127.

References

Towns in Western Australia
Great Southern (Western Australia)